M. Bhanumathi (1946 – 4 February 2013) was an Indian actress, who was active in Tamil cinema during the latter 20th Century. She was well known playing negative and supporting roles. She acted in more than 100 films in Tamil, Malayalam and Kannada and some Television series.

Personal life
Bhanumathi living with her only daughter Venkatalakshmi Teynampet, Poyas Road in Chennai. She was suffering from Jaundice and was under treatment for many months before she  died at the age of 67, on 4 February 2013.

Other works
Bhanumathi worked along with Sivaji Ganesan in Sivaji Nataka Mandram, where she was part of Jahangir, Kaalam Kanda Kavingnan, Neethiyin Nizhal, Vietnam Veedu and Vengaiyin Maindhan. and Major Sundarrajan's NSN Theatre, actor Sivakumar says, She was the heroine of almost all over hit plays such as Achchaani, Appavi, Delhi Mappillai, and Sondham, and also she done shows with the actors likes of Cho, Jaishankar, V. Gopalakrishnan, V. S. Raghavan and Shesatri.

Filmography

Stage plays
 Achchaani 
 Appavi 
 Delhi Maappillai 
 Jahangir 
 Neethiyin Nizhal 
 Kaalam Kanda Kavingnan 
 Sondham 
 Vengaiyin Maindhan 
 Vietnam Veedu

Television serials
She acted in two dozens of TV series

References

External links

20th-century Indian actresses
Indian film actresses
Indian stage actresses
1946 births
2013 deaths
Tamil actresses
Actresses in Tamil cinema
Actresses in Malayalam cinema
Actresses in Tamil television